The Beech Hill Preserve is a conservation property in Rockport, Maine.  Its  include the summit of Beech Hill, one of the few bare-topped hills in the area.  Its features include forested lower slopes, a commercial blueberry operation, and a 1913 Norwegian sod-roofed hut at the summit of the hill.  It has been protected by conservation easements since 1987, and is now owned and managed by the Coastal Mountains Land Trust.  The hut, its access road, and the gate on Beech Hill Road were listed on the National Register of Historic Places as the Beechnut Hut Historic District in 2003.

Description
The southern portion of the preserve is wooded, with a public hiking trail whose trailhead is on Rockville Street. The summit area of Beech Hill is grassy, and is accessed via a dirt road (not open to vehicular traffic) from Beech Hill Road. At the base of the road are a pair of stone piers, which originally held massive timber gates. These were built in 1913-15 by landscape architect Hans Heisted, along with the road and the hut at the summit. The road is laid out to reveal gradually more impressive views of the surrounding countryside as one ascends, culminating in views of Penobscot Bay.

The hut at the top of the hill is a stone structure, with a sod roof and an east-facing veranda supported by stone piers.  Its interior is divided into four rooms, one large space and three smaller ones, all with stone dividers.  A wooden water tank, originally fed by a pump house, is obscured within the structure.  The building has occasionally been subject to vandalism, but documentary photographs have been used to restore it to very near its as-built condition.  A circular stone garden is set in front of the hut.

History
The preserve's hilltop features were built in 1913-15 by Hans Heisted, a Norwegian immigrant, for the Gribbel family as a summer picnic and leisure spot. A roughly  area of the preserve was listed on the National Register in 2003.

See also

National Register of Historic Places listings in Knox County, Maine

References

External links
Beech Hill Preserve web site

Historic districts on the National Register of Historic Places in Maine
Buildings and structures completed in 1913
Buildings and structures in Knox County, Maine
Protected areas of Knox County, Maine
Rockport, Maine
National Register of Historic Places in Knox County, Maine